Hiba Fahsi (born 5 February 2001) is a Moroccan swimmer. She competed in the women's 50 metre backstroke event at the 2017 World Aquatics Championships. In 2019, she represented Morocco at the 2019 African Games held in Rabat, Morocco.

References

2001 births
Living people
Moroccan female swimmers
Place of birth missing (living people)
African Games competitors for Morocco
Swimmers at the 2019 African Games
Female backstroke swimmers
21st-century Moroccan women